Albert C. "Big Train" Johnson Jr. (August 20, 1913 – February 2, 1991) was an American professional basketball player. He played in the National Basketball League for the Chicago Studebaker Flyers in one game during the 1942–43 season. He also played in independent leagues, including a stint on the Harlem Globetrotters.

References

1913 births
1991 deaths
American men's basketball players
Basketball players from Chicago
Chicago Studebaker Flyers players
Forwards (basketball)
Harlem Globetrotters players